The Bishop Misbehaves may refer to:

 The Bishop Misbehaves (play), a 1934 play by Frederick Jackson
 The Bishop Misbehaves (film), a 1935 film directed by E.A. Dupont